John Winton "Buck" Hopkins (January 3, 1883 – October 2, 1929) was a Major League Baseball outfielder.

External links

Major League Baseball center fielders
St. Louis Cardinals players
Norfolk Tars players
Vicksburg Hill Billies players
Toledo Mud Hens players
Montgomery Senators players
Danville Speakers players
Saginaw Krazy Kats players
Galveston Sand Crabs players
Chattanooga Lookouts players
Portsmouth Truckers players
Newport News Shipbuilders players
Hopewell Powder Puffs players
Rocky Mount Tar Heels players
Baseball players from Virginia
People from Elizabeth City County, Virginia
1883 births
1929 deaths